Brigaden (The fire brigade) was a Norwegian drama series about firefighters

Plot
This series follows a group of firefighters in Norway. The show has been described as an intense and realistic story about a group of people who save lives. The episodes follow their professional lives as firefighters and their personal lives as their tough job takes a toll on their relationships.

Cast

References

External links 
 

NRK original programming
Norwegian drama television series
2002 Norwegian television series debuts
2003 Norwegian television series endings
2000s Norwegian television series
Television series about firefighting